North Hills may refer to:

Places in the United States
North Hills, Los Angeles, California
North Hills (Montana), a number of foothills
North Hills, New York, a village in Nassau County
North Hills (Raleigh), a mixed-use property in Raleigh, North Carolina
North Hills, Pennsylvania, a community in Montgomery County
North Hills (Pennsylvania), the collective name of the northern suburbs of Pittsburgh
North Hills (SEPTA station), a train station in Montgomery County, Pennsylvania
North Hills, West Virginia, a town in Wood County

Music
North Hills (album), by Dawes (2009)

See also
North Hill (disambiguation)